Day of Destiny also known as D.O.D is a 2021 Nigerian sci-fi adventure film written and co-directed by Akay Mason and Abosi Ogba. Abosi Ogba made his directorial debut in this film. The film stars Olumide Oworu, Denola Grey, Norbert Young and Toyin Abraham in the lead roles. The film is based on the mysterious adventures of two teenage brothers who travel back in time by 20 years to change the fortunes of the family. It is also the first Nigerian family adventure film as well as Nigeria's first-ever time traveller film and was also the first Nigerian film to be released in 2021.

Cast 

 Olumide Oworu as Chidi
 Denola Grey as Rotimi
 Norbert Young
 Toyin Abraham
 Jide Kosoko
 Blossom Chukwujekwu
 In Dima-Okojie
 Ireti Doyle
 Broda Shaggi
 Tega Akpobome

Release  
The film was initially supposed to have its theatrical release on 30 October 2020 but was postponed to 1 January 2021 due to End SARS protests. The film had its theatrical release on 1 January 2021 coinciding with the New Year and opened to positive reviews from critics while also became a box office success. It was released on Netflix on 13 July 2021.

Awards and nominations

References

External links 

2021 directorial debut films
2021 adventure films
English-language Nigerian films
Nigerian adventure films
Nigerian science fiction films
2021 science fiction films
2020s English-language films